Fearnet was an American digital cable television network, website and video on demand service owned by Comcast. The network specialized in horror entertainment programming through a mix of acquired and original series, and feature films.

Background and platforms

Fearnet on Demand
Fearnet launched on October 31, 2006 as a video on demand service, Fearnet On Demand. It was originally operated as a joint venture between Comcast, Lions Gate Entertainment, and Sony Pictures Entertainment. The on-demand service featured full-length horror, thriller, and suspense films as well as shorts, trailers, interviews, and behind-the-scenes featurettes. It was available to subscribers of Comcast, Cox Communications, Verizon FiOS, AT&T U-verse, Insight Communications, Bresnan Communications, Guadalupe Valley Systems, Buckeye CableSystem, Time Warner Cable, Wave Broadband, Bright House Networks, and CenturyLink.

Fearnet cable channel
Fearnet launched as a linear cable channel on October 31, 2010. The network was originally scheduled to launch four weeks earlier on October 1, but the date was pushed back as Fearnet was in the midst of carriage negotiations with cable providers to carry the linear channel. The Fearnet channel was available through Comcast (in select markets), Cox Communications, Time Warner Cable, Verizon FiOS, Bright House Networks, and CenturyLink. The network aired over 350 full-length feature films annually, as well as popular series (such as Tales from the Crypt and Reaper) and original content (such as Holliston) and the weekend program block called "Funhouse".

In September 2012, Fearnet became the first television network to offer Dynamic Ad Insertion (DAI), technology which decreases integration time from four weeks to as few as three days, and allows advertisers to refresh creative mid-campaign and track impressions on a daily basis.

Fearnet.com
The Fearnet website featured thriller, suspense, and horror films available for streaming (with available content updated each week); other videos including movie trailers and shorts; daily news and reviews that covered all aspects of the genre; and sweepstakes, chats, and forums. The website had over 270,000 registered users.

Leadership and ownership changes
In 2010, Peter Block (who launched the top-grossing Saw horror film franchise, and produced several other blockbuster horror and thriller films including Hostel, Cabin Fever, Open Water, and House at the End of the Street) was named president and general manager of Fearnet, replacing Diane Robina. In addition to his duties at Fearnet, Block continued to run his production company A Bigger Boat.

Merger with Chiller
On April 14, 2014, Comcast purchased Lions Gate Entertainment and Sony Pictures Entertainment's stakes in Fearnet to acquire full ownership of the channel. Comcast planned to fold Fearnet's programming into its existing horror- and thriller-focused network Chiller (owned by the company's NBCUniversal Cable unit) and move some of Fearnet's programming to Syfy. The merger occurred on July 30, 2014 at midnight, after an airing of House of 1000 Corpses. Chiller ceased operations on December 31, 2017 folding the former Fearnet channel space.

Programming

Original programming
On April 3, 2012, Fearnet premiered its first original series, Holliston, a horror/comedy series starring real-life filmmakers Adam Green and Joe Lynch as two college graduates chasing the dream of becoming successful horror filmmakers while struggling to make ends meet through their jobs at a Boston public-access cable channel. The series was renewed for a second season which aired in 2013.

Funhouse
In August 2012, Fearnet debuted a two-hour program block on Saturday and Sunday mornings called "Funhouse", featuring reruns of science-fiction and horror series aimed at children, including: The Real Ghostbusters, Tales from the Cryptkeeper, Eerie, Indiana, and Dark Oracle.

References

Streaming television
NBCUniversal networks
Companies based in Santa Monica, California
English-language television stations in the United States
Defunct television networks in the United States
Television channels and stations established in 2006
Television channels and stations disestablished in 2014
Horror fiction websites
Former Lionsgate subsidiaries
Former Sony subsidiaries